Archie Aikman (23 March 1925 – 21 February 1998) was a Scottish footballer who played for Rangers, Falkirk, St Mirren, Stenhousemuir and Dundee United. He finished as the top scorer in the Scottish Football League Division One in the 1947–48 season, scoring 20 goals. He signed for Manchester City in 1948, however due to a car crash in pre-season he never played a competitive game for them.

References

Association football forwards
Dundee United F.C. players
Falkirk F.C. players
Manchester City F.C. players
Scottish Football League representative players
Scottish Football League players
Scottish footballers
St Mirren F.C. players
Stenhousemuir F.C. players
1925 births
1998 deaths
Scottish league football top scorers
Footballers from Falkirk